Beaver Valley is a census-designated place in Gila County in the state of Arizona.  Beaver Valley is located about 10 miles north of the town of Payson.  The population, as of the 2010 U.S. Census, was 231.

Geography

Demographics

Beaver Valley first appeared on the 2010 U.S. Census as a census-designated place (CDP).

References

Census-designated places in Gila County, Arizona